Shahpuri is a Punjabi dialect spoken in the Sargodha Division of Punjab Province in Pakistan. Grierson considered it to be representative of Lahnda (Western Punjabi), but later opinions have tended to see it as a dialect of Punjabi that is transitional to Saraiki. Its name is derived from former Shahpur District (now Shahpur Tehsil, part of Sargodha District).

Geographic distribution and classification
It is mostly spoken in Sargodha District and Khushab District. It is also spoken in the neighbouring districts of Mianwali, Jhang, Chiniot, Mandi Bahauddin, and Bhakkar. It is mainly spoken on western end of Sindh River to Chenab River, traversing the Jhelum River.
This entire area has almost the same traditions, customs and culture.

The Shahpuri dialect of Punjabi has several aspects that set it apart from other Punjabi and Lahnda variants as it is an intermediary variety between Lahnda and Punjabi
Jatki language is a common name for the Jhangvi dialect, Shahpuri dialect and Dhani dialect. 
The glotlog codes for these are:
 shah1266
 jatk1238 
 jang1253

Grammar

In its phonology Shahpuri has the same tonal pattern as Standard Punjabi.

In common with Thali and Hindko, there is a class of two-syllable nouns that mark case distinctions by vowel alternation. The case suffixes of the older language have dropped, leaving the assimilated root vowels as the only indicator of the case: /jʌŋɡʊl/ ~ /jʌŋɡəl/ /jʌŋɡɪl/. Grierson explains this by substratal Dardic influence, whereas Shackle finds it more plausible that it is the result of Shahpuri's central position between areas favouring one or another vowel in these contexts.

References

Bibliography

Further reading
 
 

Languages of Pakistan
Punjabi dialects